Oreodera flavopunctata is a species of beetle in the family Cerambycidae. It was described by Ernst Fuchs in 1958.

References

Oreodera
Beetles described in 1958